Leabhar Cloinne Aodha Buidhe, or Book of the Clandeboy O'Neill's, is the title accorded to a dunaire or poem-book of the Clandeboye branch of the O'Neill dynasty. It was written at the request of Cormac Ó Neill by the scribe Ruairí Ó hUiginn of Sligo in 1680.

It contains some late medieval content, such as the "Ceart Uí Néill" which includes a list of tributes claimed by the clan throughout Ulster. Poems include those authored by members of the bardic families of Ó Gnímh, Mac an Bhaird, Ó Maolconaire and Mac Muireadhaigh.

See also
 Irish annals

Sources

Oxford Concise Companion to Irish Literature, Robert Welsh, 1996.

External Source
 Leabhar Cloinne Aodha Buidhe Edited by Thadhg O' Donnchadha, D.Litt. (Dublin, 1931) at the Internet Archive

Chronicles
Irish manuscripts
1680 books
1680 in Ireland